Jonathan Welsh (1947–2005) was a Canadian actor.

Jonathan Welsh may also refer to:
Jonathan Welsh (American football) (born 1982), American football player

See also
Jonathon Welch (born 1958), Australian choral conductor and opera singer
John Welsh (disambiguation)
Jack Welsh (disambiguation)